Michael Richard Lynch  (born 16 June 1965) is a British entrepreneur. He is the co-founder of Autonomy Corporation and the founder of Invoke Capital. Mike Lynch additionally became a co-founder, alongside Invoke Capital, of cybersecurity company Darktrace. Mike Lynch also has several other roles, including membership of the Council for Science and Technology which advises the UK government.

His entrepreneurship is associated with Silicon Fen. Lynch is known for his work applying techniques from signal processing, machine learning and pattern recognition to unstructured information. Lynch has been accused of fraudulently inflating the value of Autonomy prior to its sale to Hewlett-Packard, which has resulted in litigation and a request for his extradition to the US.

Early life and education
Lynch was born in Ilford, Essex in 1965 and grew up near Chelmsford, Essex. His mother was a nurse from Tipperary and his father a fireman from Cork.

In 1976, aged 11, he won a scholarship to Bancroft's School, Woodford. From there he went to Christ's College, Cambridge to study Natural Sciences. He combined mathematics, biological and physical sciences, taking the combination of advanced physics, mathematics and biochemistry in the IB Tripos. For part II, he chose electrical sciences where he first met Peter Rayner, his mentor in the signal processing laboratory of the engineering department. After graduating he went on to do a PhD in signal processing and communications research at the University of Cambridge, and then undertook a research fellowship in adaptive pattern recognition.

Entrepreneurial career
In the late 1980's, Lynch’s founded his first company, Lynett Systems Ltd. which designed electronic synthesizers. The company produced designs and audio products for the music industry. One of his inventions included a sampler for the Atari ST known as the Lynex.

In 1991 he set up Cambridge Neurodynamics, which specialized in computer-based fingerprint recognition.

In 1991, Lynch was a co-founder of Neurascript, a company which focused on software that delivered the recognition, extraction, indexing, classification and data capture of information from business documents.  Neurascript was sold to Dicom Group PLC during a trade sale.

In 1996 Lynch co-founded Autonomy Corporation. and he served Autonomy as CEO. During this time Autonomy acquired Dremedia, Virage ($13m), Verity ($500m), Zantaz ($375m) and Interwoven ($606m). In 2000, Autonomy Corporation was listed on Easdaq, Nasdaq and the London stock exchange. Autonomy Corporation became a FTSE100 company by 6 December.

In 2004, using the technology developed at Autonomy Corporation, Lynch founded Blinkx, a company which focused on providing video search services in the consumer internet sector.  Blinkx went public on the London Stock Exchange (AIM) in May, 2007 with a valuation of $1Bn.

In 2008, Lynch invested in Featurespace, a company set up by Professor Bill Fitzgerald. Featurespace originally focused on the development of software that detects anomalous transactions. Shortly after, Featurespace converted from a consultancy into a technology company and began developing a new form of data analysis called “adaptive behavioural analytics”. FeatureSpace expanded by 624% and employs 320 people across Cambridge, Singapore and Atlanta.

In October 2011 Autonomy was sold to Hewlett-Packard for $11 billion. In May 2012, HP fired Mike Lynch and later recorded a writedown of around $8.8 billion related to the acquisition due to "extensive accounting errors and misrepresentations" at Autonomy. Lynch faced a civil case in the UK and charges in the US related to the allegations.

In February 2013, Lynch raised $1 billion through his Invoke Capital fund to invest in up and coming British technology companies. In September 2013, Invoke Capital participated in the funding of American Swiss biotechnology company, Sophia Genetics, which provides genomic and radiomic analysis for hospitals.

In 2014, Lynch assisted in raising $13.75M in Series B financing in a round led by his company Invoke Capital. Other financiers included Swisscom and Endeavour Vision. Following this investment, the company was ranked among the 50 smartest companies by the MIT Technology Review in 2017.

In September 2013, Lynch announced Invoke had made its first investment, putting up to $20m into Darktrace (alongside Hoxton Ventures and Talis Capital) which uses the same Bayesian mathematics as Autonomy and describes itself as "the world's first behavioural cyber defence platform." As well as financial support, Invoke Capital also provided commercial and technical expertise and personnel, with around 15 Invoke employees moving over to Darktrace in 2013, including CEO Poppy Gustafsson and CTO Jack Stockdale.

On 14 September 2016, Invoke Capital announced its investment, in collaboration with Slaughter and May, in legal technology company Luminance.

In April 2021, Following its confirmation to float, Darktrace was listed on the London Stock Exchange with an initial public offering (IPO) of Shares at 250 pence per Share.  That day, Darktrace shares climbed to more than 358p, up 43% from its IPO price, and peaked at nearly 1000p five months later, but by 24 January 2022 had fallen back to 362p amid allegations from analysts its products were "snake oil".

Other interests

He was a member of the board of Cambridge Enterprise, and a member of the Council for Science and Technology. He was also a member of the Council of the Foundation for Science and Technology and a Hub Mentor in the Enterprise Hub of the Royal Academy of Engineering. Lynch was a trustee of the Royal Botanic Gardens, Kew, and a member of the board of the Create the Change Campaign at the Crick Institute, for Cancer Research UK.

He was a non-executive director of Featurespace and Blinkx plc.

He has previously served as a non-executive director to the board of the BBC, on the board of the British Library, and as a trustee of the National Endowment for Science Technology and the Arts (NESTA), where he was chairman of their investment committee.

Awards, honours and media coverage
In 1996, Lynch was given an achievement award by the Institution of Electrical Engineers.

In 2000,Time Digital Europe included Lynch in their Digital 25 list of notable technology figures.

Lynch was awarded an OBE in the 2006 New Year Honours.

In June 2008, he was elected a Fellow of the Royal Academy of Engineering.

In 2014 he was made a Deputy Lieutenant of the County of Suffolk.

The Financial Times has described Lynch as "the doyen of European software". PC Advisor has called him "Britain's most successful technology entrepreneur". In a 2009 profile in the Sunday Times, it was suggested in passing that Lynch is the nearest thing Britain has to Bill Gates.

Disputes
Larry Ellison, CEO of Oracle, once claimed that "Mr Lynch has a very poor memory or he is lying" about activities that took place in a meeting in April 2011. Lynch and investment banker Frank Quattrone contest Ellison's account of this meeting.

On 20 November 2012, Hewlett-Packard announced a writedown of assets following their purchase of Autonomy due to "disclosure failures and outright misrepresentations", which occurred before the acquisition. The total writedown amounted to $8.8bn of the purchase cost of more than $10bn. Lynch has contested these irregularities. Autonomy's financial statement auditor Deloitte has publicly supported Lynch's opinion.

HP's claims were investigated at HP's request by the UK Serious Fraud Office, but the SFO announced in January 2015 that it was ending its investigation with no action due to insufficient evidence.

On 29 November 2018 Lynch was indicted for fraud in relation to the 2011 deal with HP. In February 2021, a British court began considering whether the UK should extradite Lynch to California to face charges brought by the US Department of Justice. Lynch is contesting extradition having said that he "vigorously rejects all allegations against him." The court case has gained significant legal notoriety as it has created a wider community discussion in relation to the UK’s legal sovereignty, case jurisdiction and the legal basis for Lynch’s extradition. In July 2021 a British judge ruled that he could be extradited to the US. Lynch's extradition was temporarily halted in December 2021 after Lynch filed a judicial review; the High Court dismissed the review on 26 January 2022, and the Home Secretary, Priti Patel, approved the extradition order on 28 January 2022. He was represented in court by Alex Bailin KC.

In March 2019, HP brought a civil action for fraud in the UK courts. The action alleged that Autonomy CFO Sushovan Hussain and founder Lynch "artificially inflated Autonomy's reported revenues, revenue growth and gross margins". The case was heard in a trial lasting 93 days, with Lynch present in the witness box for 22 days, making it one of the longest cross-examinations in British legal history. In January 2022, the High Court in London ruled that HP had "substantially won" its civil case against Lynch and Hussain.

Personal life
Lynch is married and has two daughters. His entry in Who's Who lists his recreations as jazz saxophone and preserving rare breeds.

References

1965 births
Living people
People educated at Bancroft's School
Irish businesspeople
Officers of the Order of the British Empire
Deputy Lieutenants of Suffolk
Alumni of Christ's College, Cambridge
People from Chelmsford
Fellows of the Royal Society
Fellows of the Royal Academy of Engineering
British venture capitalists